Crematogaster ancipitula is a species of ant in tribe Crematogastrini. It was described by Forel in 1917.

References

ancipitula
Insects described in 1917